Mohrkirch is a municipality in the district of Schleswig-Flensburg, in Schleswig-Holstein, Germany.

See also
 Mårkær Monastery

References

Municipalities in Schleswig-Holstein
Schleswig-Flensburg